Franz Karl von Kaunitz (born 1676 in Vienna) was an Austrian clergyman and bishop for the Roman Catholic Archdiocese of Ljubljana. He was ordained in 1704. He was appointed bishop in 1710. He died in 1717.

References 

1676 births
1717 deaths
Austrian Roman Catholic bishops